This page provides the summaries of the matches of the playoff stage of the Asian football qualifiers for the 2012 Summer Olympics.

The three runners-up from the third round groups will play each other at a neutral venue on 25, 27 and 29 March 2012 (tie-breaking play-off on 31 March if necessary). Malaysia had originally been chosen but renovations to the proposed stadium as well as the unavailability of other venues due to the scheduling of domestic fixtures meant that a new destination for the three-team playoffs was required. Vietnam was later chosen by the AFC Competitions Committee as the neutral venue, with games to be played at Hanoi's My Dinh National Stadium

The winner of this group will advance to play the fourth-ranked team of the African qualification tournament in a play-off for a spot at the Olympic Games.

Playoff Group

Goalscorers 
2 goals
 Hussain Al-Hadhri

1 goal

 Raed Ibrahim Saleh
 Yasser Shahen
 Ahmad Al Douni
 Kenja Turaev
 Oleg Zoteev

References

4
2012 in Vietnamese football
2012